DU or variants may refer to:

Colleges

U.S.
 Denison University, in Granville, Ohio
 Drake University in Des Moines, Iowa
 Drexel University, in Philadelphia, Pennsylvania
 Duke University, in Durham, North Carolina
 Duquesne University in Pittsburgh, Pennsylvania
 University of Denver in Colorado

Elsewhere
 Dagon University, in Myanmar
 Damascus University, in Syria
 Dankook University, in South Korea
 Deakin University, in Australia
 Delhi University, in Delhi, India
 Dhaka University, in Bangladesh
 Dongguk University, in South Korea
 Donghua University, in Shanghai, China
 Doshisha University, in Kyoto, Japan
 University of Dublin, in Ireland
 Durham University in Durham, England

Organizations
 du (company), a United Arab Emirates telecommunication company
 Delta Upsilon, a college fraternity
 Democratic Underground, an online community for Democrats in U.S.
 Disney University, a job training location at Walt Disney World, Florida
 Double Union, a hackerspace in San Francisco, California
 Ducks Unlimited, for the conservation of wetlands habitats
 The Independents (Liechtenstein) (Die Unabhängigen), a political party in Liechtenstein

Science and technology
 du (Unix), a Unix program to estimate file space
 Depleted uranium, primarily composed of the isotope uranium-238
 Dial-up, a form of Internet access via telephone lines
 Dobson unit, a measurement of atmospheric ozone
 Duodenal ulcer
 Du, the native name of Sylviornis neocaledoniae

Other
 "Du" (Cro song)
 "Du" (Peter Maffay song)
 Du (cuneiform), a sign in cuneiform writing
 Du (personal pronoun), in Germanic languages
 Du (magazine), a Swiss magazine established in 1941
 Du (surname), transliteration of the Chinese family name 杜
 Du River, in Hubei, China
 Mount Du, in Nanyang, Henan, China
 Diplôme universitaire, a French degree
 Doctor of the University, an academic honorary degree
 Dubrovnik (city code plate prefix), Croatia
 Duisburg (city code plate prefix), Germany
 Hemus Air (IATA airline code DU), based in Sofia, Bulgaria
 Miranda Du (born 1969), United States District Judge
 Dota Underlords, a 2020 video game
 Station code for Duri railway station
 Du (footballer) (born 1978), Eduardo Chacon Coelho Lacerda, Brazilian footballer